The 2017 season was Kuala Lumpur's 39th in competitive season.

Squad information

First team squad

* Player names in bold denotes player that left mid-season
* U21=Under-21 player
* Appearances and goals counted for the domestic league only

Pre-season

Competitions

Liga Premier

League table

Results summary

Results by matchday

Matches

Piala FA

Piala Malaysia

Group stage

Club officials
Patron: Tengku Adnan Tengku Mansor
President: Adnan Md Ikshan
Deputy president: Astaman Abdul Aziz
Vice-presidents: Mohamad Sidek Khalid, Johari Abdul Ghani, Theng Book, Nordin Abdul Ghani
General secretary: Nokman Mustaffa

Coaching staff

Transfers
First transfer window started in December 2017 to 22 January 2017 and second transfer window will started on 15 May 2017 to 11 June 2017.

In

First window

Second window

Out

First window

Second window

Loan in

Second window

Loan out

Second window

Statistics

Squad appearances

Top scorers
The list is sorted by shirt number when total goals are equal.

* Player names in bold denotes player that left mid-season

Clean sheets
The list is sorted by shirt number when total clean sheets are equal.

Summary

References

2017
Malaysian football clubs 2017 season